Amarnath Yatra tragedy (1996) is referred to the deaths of over 250 pilgrims in 1996 in Jammu and Kashmir state in India due to bad weather. The pilgrims were on annual pilgrimage (Yatra) to Amarnath shrine.  
   
 

The number of pilgrims in 1992 reached 50,000. The first attack against the pilgrims happened in 1993, that year Pakistan-based Harkat-ul-Ansar had announced a ban due to demolition of Babri Masjid. The pilgrimage however passed off mostly peacefully.

In 1994-5 and 1998, the group again announced a ban on the annual Amarnath yatra. In 1996 the militants had assured that they would not interfere.

So the number of pilgrims in  1996 were higher than usual. 
Between, 21 and 25 August 1996  about one lakh (100,000) yatris were simultaneously moving either up or down between  Jammu and the Amarnath. 

During this period there was unusually heavy snowfall along with severe blizzards along the yatra route. Nearly 242 yatris lost their lives due to exhaustion, exposure, freezing, etc.
Over 263 dead bodies were found in and about the surroundings of the temple.
National Conference government constituted a committee  headed by the retired IAS officer Dr. Nitish Sengupta which was asked to inquire into various aspects of the tragedy and suggest measures and remedies to avoid recurrence of such incidents in future.

Points of References 

Natural disasters in India
Amarnath Yatra Tragedy, 1996
1990s in Jammu and Kashmir
1996 natural disasters
Disasters in Jammu and Kashmir
August 1996 events in Asia
1996 disasters in India

You can help us by editing the good points